USS Pennsylvania may refer to:

  was a 130-gun ship of the line launched in 1837 and burned to prevent capture in 1861
 A screw steamer, laid down as Keywaden in 1863 but never launched, was renamed Pennsylvania while she lay in the ways before being broken up in 1884
  was the lead ship of the  launched in 1903; renamed Pittsburgh in 1912; scrapped in 1931
  was the lead ship of the  launched in 1915 and sunk during atomic bomb testing in 1948
  is an  launched in 1988 and currently in service

See also
 
 
 
 	

United States Navy ship names